The 1987 Gael Linn Cup, the most important representative competition for elite level participants in the women's team field sport of camogie, was won by Leinster, who defeated Connacht in the final, played at Silver Park Kilmacud.

Arrangements
Angela Downey scored 4–5 as Leinster defeated Munster by 5–6 to 0–7 at Clane. Connacht defeated Ulster by nine points. Carmel O'Byrne scored 5–3 as Leinster won the final by 8–11 to 0–5 at Kilmacud's grounds in Glenalbyn. Leinster led 3–5 to 0–3 at half time.

Gael Linn Trophy
In the Gael Linn trophy semi-final at Clane Munster defeated Leinster 2–5 to 0–10 and defeated Ulster 2–6 to 2–5 in the final at Kilmacud's grounds in Silver Park.

Final stages

|}

Junior Final

|}

References

External links
 Camogie Association

1987 in camogie
1987
Cam